Science fiction opera is a subgenre of science fiction. It refers to operas whose subject-matter fits in the science fiction genre. Like science-fiction literature, science-fiction operas may be set in the future and involve spaceflight or alien invasion. Other science-fiction operas focus on a dystopian view of the future. Like Lorin Maazel's opera 1984, they may be based on a previously written science fiction book.

List of science fiction operas
The following is a partial list of science fiction operas.

Karl-Birger Blomdahl (1916–1968): Aniara (based on the poem of that name by Harry Martinson)
Viktor Ullmann (1898–1944):  The Emperor of Atlantis
Eef van Breen (born 1978) ’u’, the first opera in Klingon
Gavin Bryars (born 1943): Doctor Ox's Experiment (based on the book by Jules Verne)
Philip Glass (born 1937): The Making of the Representative for Planet 8 and The Marriages Between Zones Three, Four and Five (based on the books by Doris Lessing), 1000 Airplanes on the Roof, and The Voyage
Joseph Haydn (1732–1809) Il mondo della luna (The World of the Moon), 1777
Leoš Janáček (1854–1928): The Makropulos Affair (based on the play by Karel Čapek), premiered 1926; and The Excursions of Mr. Brouček to the Moon and to the 15th Century (1920)
Karel Janovický (b 1930): The Utmost Sail (1958) a one act opera inspired by the launch of the satellite Sputnik in 1957. It concerns the crew of a space ship flying into space and watching the Earth being consumed in a nuclear holocaust.
Lorin Maazel (1930–2014) 1984 (based on the book by George Orwell)
Tod Machover (born 1953) Valis (1987) (based on the novel VALIS by Philip K. Dick)
Gian Carlo Menotti (1911–2007) A Bride from Pluto (1982) and Help, Help, the Globolinks! (1968)
Jacques Offenbach (1819-1880) Le voyage dans la lune (based on the book De la terre à la lune by Jules Verne), premiered 1875.
Poul Ruders (born 1949) The Handmaid's Tale (based on the book of that name by Margaret Atwood)
Howard Shore (born 1946): The Fly (based on David Cronenberg's 1986 film)
Karlheinz Stockhausen (1928–2007) Licht (based on The Urantia Book)
 Steven Andrew Taylor's Paradises Lost after a short story from Ursula K. Le Guin's collection The Birthday of the World
 Michael Tippett's New Year (1989), which features a spaceship and time travelers from the future.

See also
Science fiction theatre
Space opera

References

 
Opera-related lists